Honest Ziwira (born 28 April 1995) is a Zimbabwean cricketer. He made his first-class debut for Rising Stars in the 2017–18 Logan Cup on 4 October 2017. He made his List A debut for Rising Stars in the 2017–18 Pro50 Championship on 29 April 2018. In February 2019 in the 2018–19 Logan Cup, he took his maiden five-wicket haul in first-class cricket.

References

External links
 

1995 births
Living people
Zimbabwean cricketers
Rising Stars cricketers